The 1902 Philadelphia Athletics football season  was their first season in existence. The team played in the first National Football League and finished with an overall record of 10-2-2, including a 3-2-1 record in league play. The team claimed to have won the league championship, however the Pittsburgh Stars were given the title for having a better point ratio, scoring 39 points to their NFL opponents' 22.

Schedule

Games between NFL teams are represented in bold.

Game notes

References

Philadelphia Athletics (NFL)